Caupolicán the Younger according to Juan Ignacio Molina was the son of the toqui Caupolicán. He was made toqui following the capture and execution of his father in 1558.  He continued the first Mapuche rising against the Spanish conquistadors in 1558 and commanded the Mapuche army in constructing a pukara at Quiapo to block García Hurtado de Mendoza from rebuilding a fort in Arauco completing the chain of forts for suppression of their rebellion.  In the Battle of Quiapo the Mapuche suffered a terrible defeat and there Caupolicán the younger died.  His successor as toqui was Illangulién.

The earlier historian Diego de Rosales says the toqui that led at Quiapo was Lemucaguin.

References

Sources 
  The Geographical, Natural, and Civil History of Chili By Don Juan Ignatius Molina, Longman, Hurst, Rees, and Orme, Paternoster-Row, London, 1809

1558 deaths
Indigenous leaders of the Americas
People of the Arauco War
16th-century Mapuche people
Military personnel killed in action
Year of birth unknown